David Kaše (born 28 January 1997) is a Czech professional ice hockey forward currently under contract with HC Sparta Praha of the Czech Extraliga. He previously played for the Philadelphia Flyers of the National Hockey League (NHL). Kaše was drafted in the fifth-round of the 2015 NHL Entry Draft, 128th overall by the Flyers.

Playing career
Kaše made his Czech Extraliga debut playing with Piráti Chomutov during the 2015–16 Czech Extraliga season. He later transferred as a free agent to continue his development with Mora IK of the Swedish Hockey League.

On 5 May 2018, Kaše agreed to a three-year, entry-level contract with the Philadelphia Flyers. Ahead of the 2018–19 season, Kaše was assigned to the Lehigh Valley Phantoms, the American Hockey League affiliate of the Flyers.

In the 2019–20 season, Kaše scored his first NHL goal with the Flyers on 17 December 2019, in the second period of a game against the Anaheim Ducks.

On 12 August 2020, Kaše was loaned by the Flyers to return to the Czech Extraliga with HC Karlovy Vary until the commencement of the delayed 2020–21 North American season. He returned to North America for the remainder of the 2020–21 season, playing most of his games with the Lehigh Valley Phantoms and only one with the Flyers.

On 25 May 2021, Kaše returned to his native Czech Republic, after signing a two-year contract with ELH club, HC Sparta Praha.

Personal
His older brother, Ondřej, currently plays in the NHL with the Toronto Maple Leafs.

Career statistics

Regular season and playoffs

International

References

External links

1997 births
Living people
Czech ice hockey forwards
HC Karlovy Vary players
Lehigh Valley Phantoms players
Mora IK players
People from Kadaň
Philadelphia Flyers draft picks
Philadelphia Flyers players
Piráti Chomutov players
Sportspeople from the Ústí nad Labem Region
Czech expatriate ice hockey players in the United States
Czech expatriate ice hockey players in Sweden